Lake McLarty is a  freshwater lake and associated nature reserve on the Swan Coastal Plain of Western Australia. The lake is named after a prominent pioneering family which settled in the district in the early 1860s. It is an important area for waders, or shorebirds, and is a well-known birdwatching site.

Description
The lake is oval and shallow with a gently sloping bed.

Flora and fauna

Plants
About 30 plant species have been recorded.  There are stands of banbar and swamp paperbark fringing the northern and eastern margins, with a patchy understorey of broadleaf cumbungi.  The south-western corner is dominated by pasture and the midsection of the western shore is open eucalypt woodland, including tuarts, flooded gums and swamp peppermints, with a grass understorey.  Other species present include spearwood, golden-wreath wattle, Swan River peppermint and sheoaks.  Six species of orchid have been recorded in the reserve, including pink fairy and cowslip orchids.

Birds
The exposed mudflats around the lake form essential feeding habitat for migratory waders.  Some  of the reserve has been identified by BirdLife International as an Important Bird Area (IBA) because it regularly supports over 1% of the world populations of red-necked stints, sharp-tailed sandpipers, white-headed stilts, red-necked avocets and red-capped plovers, and sometimes large numbers of blue-billed ducks.

See also

 List of lakes of Western Australia

References

Ramsar sites in Australia
Swan Coastal Plain
Birdwatching sites in Australia
McLarty
Nature reserves in Western Australia
Important Bird Areas of Western Australia